Del Allison Hall (born May 7, 1949) is a Canadian former professional ice hockey left wing.

Hall started his professional career with the California Golden Seals of the National Hockey League (NHL) in the 1971–72 NHL season, but played only nine games in the NHL over four seasons, spending the majority of those years with the organization's minor league farm teams in the IHL, WHL and CHL.

Hall moved to the rival World Hockey Association (WHA) for the 1975–76 WHA season, recording two extremely productive offensive seasons with the Phoenix Roadrunners. He started the 1977–78 WHA season with the Cincinnati Stingers, playing 25 games before being traded to the Edmonton Oilers mid-season, where he played one more game before retiring.

Career statistics

Regular season and playoffs

External links 

1949 births
Living people
California Golden Seals players
Canadian ice hockey left wingers
Cincinnati Stingers players
Columbus Golden Seals players
Edmonton Oilers (WHA) players
Ice hockey people from Ontario
Phoenix Roadrunners (WHA) players
Salt Lake Golden Eagles (CHL) players
Salt Lake Golden Eagles (WHL) players
Sportspeople from Peterborough, Ontario
Undrafted National Hockey League players